Arrubium was a fort in the Roman province of Moesia (today's Măcin, Romania).

See also
List of castra

References
Oberländer-Târnoveanu, Ernest: Aspecte ale circulaţiei monetare greceşti în Dobrogea de Nord (sec. VI î.e.n - I e.n), Pontica, IX, Constanţa, 1978, p. 59-87.
Florescu, Radu: Limesul dunărean bizantin în vremea dinastiilor isauriană şi macedoneană, Pontica, XIX, Constanţa, 1986, p. 172.

Notes

External links
Roman castra from Romania - Google Maps / Earth 

Roman legionary fortresses in Romania